This page lists public opinion polls that have been conducted in relation to the issue of Taiwanese identity.

Three-way polls

Two-way polls

References

Opinion polling in Taiwan
Identity (social science)